Salicylanilide is a chemical compound which is the amide of salicylic acid and aniline.  It is classified as both a salicylamide and an anilide.

Derivatives of salicylanilide have a variety of pharmacological uses. Chlorinated derivatives including niclosamide, oxyclozanide, and rafoxanide are used as anthelmintics, especially as flukicides. Brominated derivatives including dibromsalan, metabromsalan, and tribromsalan are used as disinfectants with antibacterial and antifungal activities.

Uses
Salicylanilides may be used as antiseptics.

References